Wawona was an American three-masted, fore-and-aft schooner that sailed from 1897 to 1947 as a lumber carrier and fishing vessel based in Puget Sound. She was one of the last survivors of the sailing schooners in the West Coast lumber trade to San Francisco from Washington, Oregon, and Northern California.

Wawona was built near Eureka, California on Humboldt Bay by Hans Ditlev Bendixsen, who was one of the most important West Coast shipbuilders of the late 19th century.

She was berthed at South Lake Union Park in Seattle adjacent to the Center for Wooden Boats. She was listed on the National Register of Historic Places, the Washington State Heritage Register, and was an official city landmark.  However, after efforts to restore the decaying ship failed, she was dismantled in March 2009. In 2012 artist John Grade used parts from the ship in a massive 65-foot sculpture called Wawona in the Grand Atrium of Seattle's Museum of History & Industry. Wood from the ship was also used to create the museum's front desk and the bar at the museum's Compass Cafe.

History

Lumber
From 1897 to 1913, the schooner carried lumber from Grays Harbor and Puget Sound ports to California. One of her captains, Ralph E. "Matt" Peasley, inspired a series of popular novels.

Fishing 
From 1914 until 1947, except during World War II, Wawona sailed to the Bering Sea with a crew of 36 to fish for cod. In 1935, her captain, Charles Foss, died at the wheel during a storm in the Aleutian Islands.

Restoration and dismantling 
In 1964, sixteen years after the vessel's retirement, a group of Seattle resdients, headed by Kay Bullitt, formed Northwest Seaport and purchased Wawona as a museum ship. The schooner was made available for public visits during her ongoing restoration.

Wawona was towed to a dry dock and dismantled on March 2, 2009. Some of the vessel's features were preserved as museum pieces.

Wawona was hauled to the Lake Union Drydock on 4 March 2009 and was dismantled. The only remaining West Coast lumber transport sailing ship is C.A. Thayer.

See also
Northwest Seaport
United States lightship Swiftsure (LV-83)
Arthur Foss
Historic preservation
National Register of Historic Places
List of schooners

Notes

External links

Northwest Seaport
YouTube Video of Wawona Being Moved to Lake Union Drydock

Schooners of the United States
Lumber schooners
Merchant ships of the United States
Historic American Engineering Record in Washington (state)
Individual sailing vessels
National Register of Historic Places in Seattle
Three-masted ships
Ships built in Eureka, California
History of Humboldt County, California
Defunct museums in Washington (state)
1897 ships
Maritime history of Washington (state)
Washington Heritage Register